Wollongong-Kembla, an electoral district of the Legislative Assembly in the Australian state of New South Wales was created in 1941 and abolished in 1968.


Election results

Elections in the 1960s

1965

1964 by-election

1962

Elections in the 1950s

1959

1956

1953

1950

1950 by-election

Elections in the 1940s

1947

1944

1941

References

New South Wales state electoral results by district